Nottinghamshire County Council is the upper-tier local authority for the non-metropolitan county of Nottinghamshire in England. It consists of 66 county councillors, elected from 56 electoral divisions every four years. The most recent election was held in 2021.

The county council is based at County Hall in West Bridgford. The council does not have jurisdiction over Nottingham, which is a unitary authority governed by Nottingham City Council.

Responsibilities
The council is responsible for public services such as education, transport, planning, social care, libraries, trading standards and waste management.

History
The council was established in 1889 under the Local Government Act 1888, covering the administrative county which excluded the county borough of Nottingham. The first elections to the county council were held on 15 January 1889, with 51 councillors being elected. The first meeting of the council took place on 1 April 1889 and 17 aldermen were elected by the elected councillors to serve on the council.

The Local Government Act 1894 created urban and rural districts with elected councils in England and Wales, forming a second tier of local government below county councils. In Nottinghamshire, The act created ten rural districts, ten urban districts and reconstituted three municipal boroughs. This system of local government continued until 1974.

The county council was reconstituted as a non-metropolitan county by the Local Government Act 1972 and the first elections were held in 1973. All urban districts, rural districts and municipal boroughs within the county were abolished and replaced with non-metropolitan districts. Whilst previously the City of Nottingham was an independent county borough and therefore not included within the administrative county of Nottinghamshire or involved in the election of county councillors, the new non-metropolitan county included Nottingham for the first time as a non-metropolitan district.

The last major change to local government in Nottinghamshire took place in 1998, when Nottingham regained independent control over its affairs when it became a unitary authority. Since then the county council has had control over the county of Nottinghamshire, excluding the City of Nottingham.

Departments
The Council is divided into four departments:

Adult Social Care and Health
Children and Families
Chief Executive's
Place

Political makeup

The most recent elections to the council were held in 2021. The political makeup of the council following the election is shown in the table below.

Electoral Divisions
Nottinghamshire is divided into 56 divisions for electoral purposes. Current boundaries have been in place since 2017 following a review by the Local Government Boundary Commission for England. Each Councillor is allocated a locality budget, described as their "Councillors' Divisional Fund".

District councils
The county council is the upper-tier of local government, below which are seven district councils with responsibility for local services such as housing, planning applications, licensing, council tax collection and rubbish collection. The districts of Nottinghamshire are;
Ashfield
Bassetlaw
Broxtowe
Gedling
Mansfield
Newark and Sherwood
Rushcliffe

References

 
County councils of England
1889 establishments in England
Local education authorities in England
Local authorities in Nottinghamshire
Major precepting authorities in England
Leader and cabinet executives